Ayanda Malinga (born 23 June 1998) is a South African rugby sevens player. She represented South Africa at the 2022 Rugby World Cup Sevens in Cape Town.

References 

Living people
1998 births
Female rugby sevens players
South Africa international women's rugby sevens players